Test cricket is the oldest form of cricket played at international level. A Test match is scheduled to take place over a period of five days, and is played by teams representing full member nations of the International Cricket Council (ICC). Australia was a founding member of the ICC having played the first Test match against England in March 1877 at the Melbourne Cricket Ground. They have played a total of 849 matches, second only to England who have played just over 1,000. , Australia is the most successful team in Test cricket with an overall winning percentage of 47.58, ahead of their nearest rival South Africa on 38.20.

Top order batsman and former captain Don Bradman holds several batting records. Considered to be the greatest batsman of all time, he played 52 Tests between 1928 and 1948. He holds the record for the highest Test average of 99.94, has scored the most Test double centuries with 12, the equal most Test triple centuries with 2 and the most runs scored in a series with 974 during the 1930 Ashes series. He also holds the highest fifth-wicket partnership with Sid Barnes with 405 runs, set during the 1946–47 Ashes series, the oldest of the wicket partnerships records. A further two Australian partnership records for the second and the sixth wickets set by Bradman still stand.

Shane Warne, regarded as one of the best bowlers in the history of the game, holds several Test records. He held the record for the most Test wickets with 708 until December 2007 when Sri Lankan bowler Muttiah Muralitharan passed Warne's milestone. Warne is second only to Muralitharan in taking the most five-wicket hauls in an innings and the most ten-wicket hauls in a Test match. Glenn McGrath, who took 563 wickets in his career, is third to England's James Anderson and Stuart Broad for the most wickets taken by a fast bowler in Test cricket. Adam Gilchrist is Australia's most successful wicket-keeper having taken 416 dismissals. He is second only to South Africa's Mark Boucher with 555 to his name. Allan Border, who made his Test debut in 1978 and captained Australia from 1984 until his retirement in 1994, holds the Australian record for the most consecutive matches played with 153 and the record for the most matches played as skipper for Australia with 93.

Key
The top five records are listed for each category, except for the team wins, losses, draws and ties and the partnership records. Tied records for fifth place are also included. Explanations of the general symbols and cricketing terms used in the list are given below. Specific details are provided in each category where appropriate. All records include matches played for Australia only, and are correct .

Team records

Team wins, losses, draws and ties
, Australia has played 851 Test matches resulting in 405 victories, 228 defeats, 216 draws and 2 ties for an overall winning percentage of 47.59, the highest winning percentage of Test playing teams. Australia has played the second-highest number of Test matches, behind England who have competed in 1,058. Australia has never lost or drawn a match against Zimbabwe, the only team to do so. Australia is also the only team to win their debut Test match with every other team losing their first Test except Zimbabwe who drew against India.

Team scoring records

Most runs in an innings
The highest innings total scored in Test cricket came in the series between Sri Lanka and India in August 1997. Playing in the first Test at R. Premadasa Stadium in Colombo, the hosts posted a first innings total of 6/952d. This broke the longstanding record of 7/903d which England set against Australia in the final Test of the 1938 Ashes series at The Oval. The fifth Test of the 1954–55 series against the West Indies saw Australia set their highest innings total of 8/758d, the eighth-highest score in Test cricket.

Highest successful run chases
Australia's highest successful run chase in Test cricket came in the fourth Test of the 1948 Ashes series at Headingley. Australia reached the target of 404 runs with seven wickets in hand. This was a Test record at the time of posting and remained so until May 2003 when the West Indies defeated Australia at the Antigua Recreation Ground. Set 418 for victory in the final innings, the hosts achieved the target for the loss of seven wickets.

Fewest runs in an innings
The lowest innings total scored in Test cricket came in the second Test of England's tour of New Zealand in March 1955. Trailing England by 46, New Zealand was bowled out in their second innings for 26 runs. The equal fifth-lowest score in Test history is Australia's total of 36 scored in their first innings against England in the first Test of the 1902 Ashes series.

Result records
A Test match is won when one side has scored more runs than the total runs scored by the opposing side during their two innings. If both sides have completed both their allocated innings and the side that fielded last has the higher aggregate of runs, it is known as a win by runs. This indicates the number of runs that they had scored more than the opposing side. If one side scores more runs in a single innings than the total runs scored by the other side in both their innings, it is known as a win by innings and runs. If the side batting last wins the match, it is known as a win by wickets, indicating the number of wickets that were still to fall.

Greatest win margins (by innings)

The fifth Test of the 1938 Ashes series at The Oval saw England win by an innings and 579 runs, the largest victory by an innings in Test cricket history. The next largest victory was Australia's win against South Africa in the first Test of the 2001–02 tour at the Wanderers Stadium, where the tourists won by an innings and 360 runs.

Greatest win margins (by runs)
The greatest winning margin by runs in Test cricket was England's victory over Australia by 675 runs in the first Test of the 1928–29 Ashes series. The next two largest victories were recorded by Australia including defeat over England in the final Test of the 1934 Ashes series by 562 runs.

Greatest win margins (by 10 wickets)
Australia have won a Test match by a margin of 10 wickets on 30 occasions, more than any other Test playing team.

Narrowest win margins (by runs)

Australia's narrowest win by runs was against England in the fourth Test of the 1902 Ashes series at Old Trafford. Set 124 runs for victory in the final innings, England were bowled all out for 120 to give victory to Australia by three runs. This was the equal third-narrowest win in Test cricket, with the narrowest being the West Indies' one-run win over Australia in 1993.

Narrowest win margins (by wickets)
Australia's narrowest win by wickets came in the fourth Test of the West Indies tour of Australia in 1951–52. Played at the Melbourne Cricket Ground, the hosts won the match by a margin of one wicket, one of only fifteen one-wicket victories in Test cricket.

Greatest loss margins (by innings)
The Oval in London played host the greatest defeat by an innings in Test cricket. The final Test of the 1938 Ashes saw England defeat the tourists by an innings and 579 runs, to the draw the series at one match all.

Greatest loss margins (by runs)
The first Test of the 1928–29 Ashes series saw Australia defeated by England by 675 runs, the greatest losing margin by runs in Test cricket. The match was played at the Brisbane Exhibition Ground, the first of only two Test matches contested at the venue.

Greatest loss margins (by 10 wickets)
Australia have lost a Test match by a margin of 10 wickets on 10 occasions.

Narrowest loss margins (by runs)

Only one match in  years of Test cricket has been decided by a margin of one run, the fourth Test of the West Indian tour of Australia in 1992–93 playing for the Frank Worrell Trophy. Contested at Adelaide Oval, Australia was set 186 runs for victory in the final innings. With just two runs left to score, Australia's number eleven batsman Craig McDermott was caught behind off the bowling of Courtney Walsh, to give the victory to the tourists.

Narrowest loss margins (by wickets)
Test cricket has seen fifteen matches been decided by a margin of one wicket, with Australia being defeated in six of them. The first of these was the final Test of the 1902 Ashes series at The Oval where England ran down the target of 263 runs in the final innings. The most recent occurring during the 2019 Ashes series against England. The third Test at Headingley saw the hosts achieving their highest successful run chase in Test cricket of 359 runs.

Tied matches 
A tie can occur when the scores of both teams are equal at the conclusion of play, provided that the side batting last has completed their innings. Only two matches have ended in a tie in Test cricket history, both of which involved Australia.

Individual records

Batting records

Most career runs
A run is the basic means of scoring in cricket.

India's Sachin Tendulkar has scored the most runs in Test cricket with 15,921. Second is Ricky Ponting of Australia with 13,378 ahead of Jacques Kallis from South Africa in third with 13,289. Allan Border and Steve Waugh are the only other Australian batsmen who have scored more than 10,000 runs in Test cricket.

Fastest runs getter

Most runs in each batting position

Highest individual score
The first Test of the 2003–04 series of the Southern Cross Trophy, contested between Australia and Zimbabwe, at the WACA Ground saw Matthew Hayden of Australia set the highest individual Test innings score with 380, surpassing Brian Lara's 375 scored against England in April 1994 at the Antigua Recreation Ground. Six months after Hayden set the record, the West Indian claimed it back scoring 400 not out against the same opposition and on the same ground.

Highest career average
A batsman's batting average is the total number of runs they have scored divided by the number of times they have been dismissed.

Australia's Don Bradman, widely acknowledged as the greatest batsman of all time, finished his Test career with an average of 99.94. Adam Voges who retired in 2016, has the second-best career average in Test cricket with 61.87. , the currently active Steve Smith with an average of 60.89, is fourth.

Most half-centuries
A half-century is a score of between 50 and 99 runs. Statistically, once a batsman's score reaches 100, it is no longer considered a half-century but a century.

Sachin Tendulkar of India has scored the most half-centuries in Test cricket with 68. He is followed by the West Indies' Shivnarine Chanderpaul on 66, India's Rahul Dravid and Allan Border of Australia on 63 and in fifth with 62 fifties to his name, Australia's Ricky Ponting.

Most centuries

A century is a score of 100 or more runs in a single innings.

Tendulkar has also scored the most centuries in Test cricket with 51. South Africa's Jacques Kallis is next on 45 and Ricky Ponting with 41 hundreds is in third.

Most double centuries
A double century is a score of 200 or more runs in a single innings.

Bradman holds the Test record for the most double centuries scored with twelve, one ahead of Sri Lanka's Kumar Sangakkara who finished his career with eleven. In third is Brian Lara of the West Indies with nine. England's Wally Hammond, India's Virat Kohli and Mahela Jayawardene of Sri Lanka have all scored seven and Ponting is one of six cricketers who reached the mark on six occasions.

Most triple centuries
A triple century is a score of 300 or more runs in a single innings.

Bradman holds the equal Test record for the most triple centuries scored with two, along with India's Virender Sehwag and West Indians Chris Gayle and Brian Lara. Six Australians have scored a single Test triple century with former vice-captain David Warner the most recent to do so in 2019, .

Most Sixes

Most Fours

Highest batting strike rate

Most runs in a series
The 1930 Ashes series in England saw Bradman set the record for the most runs scored in a single series, falling just 26 short of 1,000 runs. He is followed by Wally Hammond with 905 runs scored in the 1928–29 Ashes series. Mark Taylor with 839 in the 1989 Ashes and Neil Harvey with 834 in 1952–53 South African series are third and fourth on the list, respectively.

Most ducks
A duck refers to a batsman being dismissed without scoring a run. Glenn McGrath has scored the fourth-highest number of ducks in Test cricket behind Courtney Walsh with 43, the currently active Stuart Broad with 39  and Chris Martin with 36.

Bowling records

Most career wickets 
A bowler takes the wicket of a batsman when the form of dismissal is bowled, caught, leg before wicket, stumped or hit wicket. If the batsman is dismissed by run out, obstructing the field, handling the ball, hitting the ball twice or timed out the bowler does not receive credit.

Shane Warne held the record for the most Test wickets with 708 until December 2007 when Sri Lankan bowler Muttiah Muralitharan passed Warne's milestone. Muralitharan, who continued to play until 2010, finished with 800 wickets to his name. James Anderson of England is third with 675 Test wickets to his name , overtaking Australia's Glenn McGrath in September 2018 to become the fast bowler with the most Test wickets. India's Anil Kumble is fourth on the list taking 619 wickets. Stuart Broad with 566 wickets moved into fifth in September 2022 after becoming the second fast bowler to overtake McGrath's total of 563 wickets.

Best figures in an innings 
Bowling figures refers to the number of the wickets a bowler has taken and the number of runs conceded.

There have been three occasions in Test cricket where a bowler has taken all 10 wickets in a single innings – Jim Laker of England took 10/53 against Australia in 1956, India's Anil Kumble in 1999 returned figures of 10/74 against Pakistan and in 2021 Ajaz Patel of New Zealand took 10/119 against India. Arthur Mailey is one of 16 bowlers who have taken nine wickets in a Test match innings.

Best figures in a match 
A bowler's bowling figures in a match is the sum of the wickets taken and the runs conceded over both innings.

No bowler in the history of Test cricket has taken all 20 wickets in a match. The closest to do so was English spin bowler Jim Laker. During the fourth Test of the 1956 Ashes series, Laker took 9/37 in the first innings and 10/53 in the second to finish with match figures of 19/90. Bob Massie's figures of 16/137, taken in second match of the 1972 Ashes series, is the fourth-best in Test cricket history.

Best career average 
A bowler's bowling average is the total number of runs they have conceded divided by the number of wickets they have taken.

Nineteenth century English medium pacer George Lohmann holds the record for the best career average in Test cricket with 10.75. J. J. Ferris, one of fifteen cricketers to have played Test cricket for more than one team, is second behind Lohmann with an overall career average of 12.70 runs per wicket.

Best career economy rate 
A bowler's economy rate is the total number of runs they have conceded divided by the number of overs they have bowled.

English bowler William Attewell, who played 10 matches for England between 1884 and 1892, holds the Test record for the best career economy rate with 1.31. Australia's Bert Ironmonger, with a rate of 1.69 runs per over conceded over his 14-match Test career, is fifth on the list.

Best career strike rate 

A bowler's strike rate is the total number of balls they have bowled divided by the number of wickets they have taken.

As with the career average above, the top two bowlers with the best Test career strike rate are George Lohmann and J. J. Ferris, with Lohmann on 34.1 and Ferris with an overall career strike rate of 37.7 balls per wicket.

Most five-wicket hauls in an innings 
A five-wicket haul refers to a bowler taking five wickets in a single innings.

Shane Warne is second only to Sri Lanka's Muttiah Muralitharan in taking the most five-wicket hauls in Test cricket with Muralitharan taking 67 throughout his career and Warne achieving 37.

Most ten-wicket hauls in a match 
A ten-wicket haul refers to a bowler taking ten or more wickets in a match over two innings.

As with the five-wicket hauls above, Shane Warne is second only to Muttiah Muralitharan of Sri Lanka in taking the most ten-wicket hauls in Test cricket with Muralitharan haven taken 22 to Warne's 10.

Worst figures in an innings 
The worst figures in a single innings in Test cricket came in the third Test between the West Indies at home to Pakistan in 1958. Pakistan's Khan Mohammad returned figures of 0/259 from his 54 overs in the second innings of the match. The worst figures by an Australian is 0/156 that came off the bowling of Mitchell Swepson in his debut Test in March 2022 against Pakistan.

Worst figures in a match 
The worst figures in a match in Test cricket were taken by South Africa's Imran Tahir in the second Test against Australia at the Adelaide Oval in November 2012. He returned figures of 0/180 from his 23 overs in the first innings and 0/80 off 14 in the third innings for a total of 0/260 from 37 overs. He claimed the record in his final over when two runs came from it – enough for him to pass the previous record of 0/259, set 54 years prior.

The worst figures by an Australian came in the first Test of the 2010–11 Ashes series when Mitchell Johnson returned figures of 0/66 and 0/104 for a total of 0/170 off 42 overs, equalling the figures that Geoff Lawson set in the second Test of the Ashes series of 1986–87 from 50 overs.

Most wickets in a series 

England's seventh Test tour of South Africa in 1913–14 saw the record set for the most wickets taken by a bowler in a Test series. English paceman Sydney Barnes played in four of the five matches and achieved a total of 49 wickets to his name. Jim Laker sits second on the list with 46 wickets taken during the 1956 Ashes series. Australia's Clarrie Grimmett is third with his 44 wickets taken against South Africa during the 1935–36 tour.

All-round Records

1000 runs and 100 wickets

Wicket-keeping records
The wicket-keeper is a specialist fielder who stands behind the stumps being guarded by the batsman on strike and is the only member of the fielding side allowed to wear gloves and leg pads.

Most career dismissals 

A wicket-keeper can be credited with the dismissal of a batsman in two ways, caught or stumped. A fair catch is taken when the ball is caught fully within the field of play without it bouncing after the ball has touched the striker's bat or glove holding the bat, while a stumping occurs when the wicket-keeper puts down the wicket while the batsman is out of his ground and not attempting a run.

Australia's Adam Gilchrist is second only South Africa's Mark Boucher is taking most dismissals in Test cricket as a designated wicket-keeper, with Boucher taking 555 to Gilchrist 416.

Most career catches 
Boucher also leads Gilchrist in the number of catches taken as a designated wicket-keeper in Test cricket, 532 to 379.

Most career stumpings 

Bert Oldfield, Australia's fifth-most capped wicket-keeper, holds the record for the most stumpings in Test cricket with 52. He is followed by England's Godfrey Evans with 46 to his name. Indian glovemen Syed Kirmani and MS Dhoni are both equal third on 38 and Gilchrist is fifth on the list with 37.

Most dismissals in an innings 
Four wicket-keepers have taken seven dismissals in a single innings in a Test match—Wasim Bari of Pakistan in 1979, Englishman Bob Taylor in 1980, New Zealand's Ian Smith in 1991 and most recently West Indian gloveman Ridley Jacobs against Australia in 2000.

The feat of taking 6 dismissals in an innings has been achieved by 25 wicket-keepers on 33 occasions including 5 Australians.

Most dismissals in a series 
Brad Haddin holds the Test cricket record for the most dismissals taken by a wicket-keeper in a series. He took 29 catches during the 2013 Ashes series which broke the previous record held by fellow Australian Rod Marsh where he took 28 catches in the 1982–83 Ashes series.

Fielding records

Most career catches 
Caught is one of the nine methods a batsman can be dismissed in cricket. A fair catch is defined as a fielder catching the ball, from a legal delivery, fully within the field of play without it bouncing when the ball has touched the striker's bat or glove holding the bat. The majority of catches are caught in the slips, located behind the batsman, next to the wicket-keeper, on the off side of the field. Most slip fielders are top order batsmen.

India's Rahul Dravid holds the record for the most catches in Test cricket by a non-wicket-keeper with 210, followed by Mahela Jayawardene of Sri Lanka on 205 and South African Jacques Kallis with 200. Ricky Ponting is the highest ranked Australian in fourth, securing 196 catches in his Test career.

Most catches in a series 
The 1920–21 Ashes series, in which Australia whitewashed England 5–0 for the first time, saw the record set for the most catches taken by a non-wicket-keeper in a Test series. Australian all-rounder Jack Gregory took 15 catches in the series as well as 23 wickets. Greg Chappell, a fellow Australian all-rounder, and India's KL Rahul are equal second behind Gregory with 14 catches taken during the 1974–75 Ashes series and during the 2018 Indian tour of England respectively. Four players have taken 13 catches in a series on six occasions with both Bob Simpson and Brian Lara having done so twice and Rahul Dravid and Alastair Cook once.

Other records

Most career matches 
India's Sachin Tendulkar holds the record for the most Test matches played with 200, followed by the currently active English fast bowler James Anderson on 172, with former captains Ricky Ponting and Steve Waugh being joint third with each having represented Australia on 168 occasions.

Most consecutive career matches 

Former English captain Alastair Cook holds the record for the most consecutive Test matches played with 159. He broke Allan Border's long standing record of 153 matches in June 2018. Mark Waugh, the Australian middle order batsman who played 107 consecutive Test matches, is third. The recently retired New Zealand wicket-keeper-batsman Brendon McCullum, who is fifth on the list with 101 matches, is the highest ranked cricketer who never missed a Test match during his playing career. Adam Gilchrist, in seventh on 96, is the highest ranked Australian player to achieve the feat.

Most matches as captain 

Graeme Smith, who led the South African cricket team from 2003 to 2014, holds the record for the most matches played as captain in Test cricket with 109. Allan Border, who skippered Australia from 1984 to 1994 is second with 93 matches. New Zealand's captain from 1997 to 2006, Stephen Fleming, is third on the list with 80 and in fourth on 77 is Australia's Ricky Ponting who led the side for six years from 2004 to 2010.

Most man of the match awards

Most man of the series awards

Youngest players 
The youngest player to play in a Test match is claimed to be Hasan Raza at the age of 14 years and 227 days. Making his debut for Pakistan against Zimbabwe on 24 October 1996, there is some doubt as to the validity of Raza's age at the time. The youngest Australian to play Test cricket was Ian Craig who at the age of 17 years and 239 days debuted in the final Test of the series against South Africa in February 1953.

Oldest players on debut 

At 49 years and 119 days, James Southerton of England, playing in the very first Test match in March 1877, is the oldest player to make his debut in Test cricket. Second on the list is Miran Bakhsh of Pakistan who at 47 years and 284 days made his debut against India in 1955. Australia's Don Blackie is the third-oldest player to make his debut, breaking into the side during the second Test of the 1928–29 Ashes series at the age of 46 years and 253 days. He broke the record set by his teammate Bert Ironmonger who debuted in the previous Test match two weeks earlier.

Oldest players 
England all-rounder Wilfred Rhodes is the oldest player to appear in a Test match. Playing in the fourth Test against the West Indies in 1930 at Sabina Park, in Kingston, Jamaica, he was aged 52 years and 165 days on the final day's play. The second-oldest Test player is Bert Ironmonger who was aged 50 years and 327 days when he represented Australia for the final time in the fifth Test of the 1932–33 Ashes series at the Sydney Cricket Ground.

Partnership records
In cricket, two batsmen are always present at the crease batting together in a partnership. This partnership will continue until one of them is dismissed, retires or the innings comes to a close.

Highest partnerships by wicket

A wicket partnership describes the number of runs scored before each wicket falls. The first wicket partnership is between the opening batsmen and continues until the first wicket falls. The second wicket partnership then commences between the not out batsman and the number three batsman. This partnership continues until the second wicket falls. The third wicket partnership then commences between the not out batsman and the new batsman. This continues down to the tenth wicket partnership. When the tenth wicket has fallen, there is no batsman left to partner, so the innings is closed.

Australian batsmen hold two Test wicket partnerships records. Sid Barnes and Don Bradman came together in the second Test of the 1946–47 Ashes series at the Sydney Cricket Ground and put together a fifth wicket partnership of 405 runs. The other record is the fourth wicket partnership of 449 which was set by still active Shaun Marsh and the recently retired Adam Voges. This came in the first Test against the West Indies at Bellerive Oval in December 2015.

Highest partnerships by runs
The highest Test partnership by runs for any wicket is held by the Sri Lankan pairing of Kumar Sangakkara and Mahela Jayawardene who put together a third wicket partnership of 624 runs during the first Test against South Africa in July 2006. This broke the record of 576 runs set by their compatriots Sanath Jayasuriya and Roshan Mahanama against India in 1997. New Zealand's Andrew Jones and Martin Crowe hold the third-highest Test partnership with 467 made in 1991 against Sri Lanka. Equal fourth on the list is Mudassar Nazar and Javed Miandad of Pakistan who together scored 451 against Pakistan in 1983 and the Australian pairing of Bill Ponsford and Don Bradman putting on the same score against England in the 1934 Ashes series.

Highest overall partnership runs by a pair

Umpiring records

Most matches umpired
An umpire in cricket is a person who officiates the match according to the Laws of Cricket. Two umpires adjudicate the match on the field, whilst a third umpire has access to video replays, and a fourth umpire looks after the match balls and other duties. The records below are only for on-field umpires.

Aleem Dar of Pakistan holds the record for the most Test matches umpired with 143, . The currently active Dar set the record in December 2019 overtaking West Indian Steve Bucknor's mark of 128 matches. They are followed by South Africa's Rudi Koertzen who officiated in 108. The most experienced Australian is Daryl Harper who is fourth on the list with 95 Test matches umpired.

Notes

References

Test
Australia